Frederick William Strange (September 9, 1844 – June 5, 1897) was an English-born physician, surgeon and political figure in Ontario, Canada. He represented York North in the House of Commons of Canada from 1878 to 1882 as a Liberal-Conservative member.

He was the son of Thomas Strange of Berkshire and studied medicine at Liverpool and University College in London. Strange came to Ontario in 1869. A long-time militia medical officer, he served as a deputy surgeon general for the Canadian militia from 1893 to 1896 and was coroner for York County. Strange was an unsuccessful candidate for a seat in the House of Commons in 1896. He died a year later at the age of 52.

The community of Strange was named in his honour after he secured a post office for the community in 1880.

References 
 
The Canadian parliamentary companion and annual register, 1879 CH Mackintosh

1844 births
1897 deaths
Members of the House of Commons of Canada from Ontario
Conservative Party of Canada (1867–1942) MPs
Alumni of University College London
Canadian coroners